Royal Air Force Bircham Newton or more simply RAF Bircham Newton is a former Royal Air Force station located  south east of Docking, Norfolk and  north east of King's Lynn, Norfolk, England.

History

The site was first used during the First World War and received the largest British bomber of the time, the Handley Page V/1500. They would have carried out bombing missions against Berlin but the Armistice was arranged before any missions were actually flown.

There were several communication squadrons active at the airfield during 1919.

The airfield was equipped with one aircraft repair shed and three double bay general service sheds, although these had been demolished by 1937. It had two Belfast hangars, three C Type hangars, three Bellman hangars and ten Blister hangars.

It operated through the Second World War as part of No. 16 Group RAF as part of RAF Coastal Command.

No. 206 Squadron RAF was one of the squadrons being based there, on maritime patrol duties. Two satellite airfields, RAF Docking and RAF Langham were opened to accommodate units.

In 1965 the airfield was used for evaluation trials of the Hawker Siddeley Kestrel V/STOL aircraft.

Squadrons
First World War and Inter war years

Second World War

Royal Navy

Units

Second World War and Cold War

Current use

After closure as an operational airfield in 1966, the airfield became the home of the Construction Industry Training Board. The area of the airfield once occupied by the grass runways has disappeared under the activities of construction equipment, but the majority of buildings on the site remain in use by the CITB. The control tower was demolished in 2010 due to its poor condition.

In February 2020, the CITB announced it had sold the site to West Suffolk College, based in Bury St Edmunds, aiming to continue construction industry training provision at Bircham Newton.

See also
List of Norfolk airfields
List of former Royal Air Force stations

References

Citations

Bibliography

External links

RAF Bircham Newton Memorial Project
Wartime Memory Projects – Bricham Newton
Interwar photographs of Bircham Newton
Royal Air Force Administrative Apprentice Association Royal Air Force Bircham Newton

Royal Air Force stations in Norfolk
Royal Air Force stations of World War II in the United Kingdom